Helena Winkelman (born 27 February 1974) is a Swiss-Dutch composer and violinist. She has won the Andrea Postaccini Italian violin competition and the Walther Bringolf Award for Chamber Music of the Music Academy of Heidelberg-Mannheim. The violin she uses was made by Francesco Rugeri in 1687.

References

External links 
 Official website
 Helena Winkelman, Ciaconna played by Helena Winkelman (YouTube)

1974 births
Living people
People from Schaffhausen
Swiss classical violinists
Swiss composers
Swiss opera composers
21st-century classical violinists